Mark Anthony Downes (born 1 August 1974) is an English cricketer. Downes is a right-handed batsman who bowls right-arm fast-medium. He was born in Wellington, Shropshire.

Downes made his debut for Shropshire in the 1999 MCCA Knockout Trophy against Cumberland. Downes has played Minor counties cricket for Shropshire from 1999 to present, which has included 15 Minor Counties Championship appearances and 14 MCCA Knockout Trophy appearances. He made his List A debut against Devon in the 2001 Cheltenham & Gloucester Trophy. He made 4 further List A appearances, the last of which came against Hampshire in the 2005 Cheltenham & Gloucester Trophy. In his 4 List A matches, he scored 42 runs at an average of 10.50, with a high score of 16. With the ball, he took 3 wickets at a bowling average of 38.33, with best figures of 2/39.

References

External links
Mark Downes at ESPNcricinfo
Mark Downes at CricketArchive

1974 births
Living people
People from Wellington, Shropshire
English cricketers
Shropshire cricketers